Senator Packer may refer to:

Horace Billings Packer (1851–1940), Pennsylvania State Senate
William F. Packer (1807–1870), Pennsylvania State Senate